The 1996 Pittsburgh Panthers football team represented the University of Pittsburgh in the 1996 NCAA Division I-A football season. The season proved to be a major disappointment as the Panthers finished 4-7, 8th in the Big East. They finished 3-4 within their conference and were 1-3 in non-conference affairs. In their 4th game, the Panthers were annihilated by Ohio State, 72-0. This was the worst loss in school history.

Schedule

Coaching staff

Roster

Team players drafted into the NFL

References

Pittsburgh
Pittsburgh Panthers football seasons
Pittsburgh Panthers football